Confit (from the French word confire, literally "to preserve") is any type of food that is cooked slowly over a long period as a method of preservation.

Confit, as a cooking term, describes when food is cooked in grease, oil, or sugar water (syrup), at a lower temperature, as opposed to deep frying. The term is usually used in modern cuisine to mean long, slow cooking in oil or fat at low temperatures, many having no element of preservation, such as in dishes like confit potatoes.

For meat, this method requires the meat to be salted as part of the preservation process. After salting and cooking in fat, confit can last for several months or years when sealed and stored in a cool, dark place. Confit is a specialty of southwestern France.

Etymology
The word comes from the French verb confire (to preserve), which in turn comes from the Latin word (conficere), meaning "to do, to produce, to make, to prepare." The French verb was first applied in medieval times to fruits cooked and preserved in sugar.

Fruit confit
Fruit confit are candied fruit (whole fruit, or pieces thereof) preserved in sugar. The fruit must be fully infused with sugar to its core; larger fruit takes considerably longer than smaller ones to candy. Thus, while small fruit such as cherries are confits whole, it is quite rare to see whole large fruit, such as melon confits since the time and energy involved in producing large fruit confits makes them quite expensive.

Meat confit

Confit of goose (confit d'oie) and duck (confit de canard) are usually prepared from the legs of the bird. The meat is salted and seasoned with herbs and slowly cooked submerged in its own rendered fat (never to exceed ), in which it is then preserved by allowing it to cool and storing it in the fat. Turkey and pork may be treated in the same manner. Meat confit is a specialty of the southwest of France (Toulouse, Dordogne, etc.) and is used in dishes such as cassoulet. Confit preparations originated as a means of preserving meat without refrigeration.

In a restaurant context, confit is usually served after further preparation. Whole confit leg is baked to crisp the skin or added to a casserole-type dish. Confit duck leg is used to make rillettes.

History 
The traditional meat for confit includes waterfowl such as goose and duck, and pork. Duck gizzards are also commonly cooked in the confit method. Varying forms of this delicacy thrive throughout southern France.

"Confit country" is the area of Occitan France, where goose fat is used for cooking, as opposed to olive oil, which is used in Provence, where olives were plentiful and thus cheap.

Confit country is divided roughly into regions where one type of meat predominates the confit preparations. Goose confit is associated with the Béarn and Basque regions with their classic specialties of cassoulet and garbure, hearty and earthy dishes of confit and beans. Saintonge and Brantôme feature duck confit, often with potatoes and truffles.

Non-waterfowl meats are frequently treated to the confit process but are not classically considered true confits. The French refer only to duck, and goose confits as true confits; other meats poached in duck or goose fat are considered en confit ("in confit"). For example, chicken cooked in goose fat is called poulet en confit. Pork is often confit and shredded to create rillettes.

Condiment confit

Italian cooking uses several "condiment confits," such as onion confit, chili confit, and garlic confit.

See also

 Maceration (food)
 Confit byaldi
 Fruit preserves
 Potted meat
 Rendang

References

Further reading
 Larousse gastronomique: the encyclopedia of food, wine & cookery, Ed. Charlotte Turgeon and Nina Froud. New York: Crown Publishers, 1961. The English translation of the 1938 edition. .
 James, Kenneth. Escoffier: The King of Chefs. Hambledon and London: Cambridge University Press, 2002.

External links 
 

Charcuterie
Cooking techniques
Culinary terminology
Food preservation
French cuisine
Garde manger
Jams and jellies
Occitan cuisine